Adam Idah (born 11 February 2001) is an Irish professional footballer who plays as a forward for  club Norwich City and the Republic of Ireland national team.

Early career
Idah was born in Cork and grew up in the city, attending Douglas Community School. He started playing football with College Corinthians in 2007 at the age of six. He stayed with the Corinthians for 10 years progressing through the youth levels before joining Norwich City as an academy scholar in 2017. In his first season at Norwich Idah played in the Professional Development League in Norwich's Premier League Under-18 side, scoring nine goals in 15 games. He completed a 10-minute hat-trick against Barnsley in the FA Youth Cup before scoring another hat-trick against Tottenham Hotspur in the U18 league. At the end of the season Idah won both the Norwich Under-18 player of the season and the academy player of the year awards.

During his second season at Norwich, Idah was productive in the youth team. He played in the club's under-23 side in Premier League 2, scoring 12 goals in 19 games. At the end of the season Idah was one of the eight nominations for Premier League 2 player of the season. On 4 July 2019, he signed his first professional contract with the club, signing a contract until 2023. In the 2019 pre-season, Idah trained with the first team, and was chosen to be part of Norwich's squad on their pre-season tour to Germany. In the first game of the tour he came on as a substitute in the 2–2 draw with Arminia Bielefeld, starting his first senior game for Norwich three days later in the friendly against Bonner SC, scoring two goals. Idah again featured in Norwich's final game of the tour, coming on as a substitute against Schalke 04.

Senior career
Idah made his first senior appearance on 27 August 2019, playing the full 90 minutes as Norwich lost 1–0 to Crawley Town in the EFL Cup. He made his Premier League debut as a substitute against Crystal Palace on 1 January 2020 before starting Norwich's 2019–20 FA Cup third round match at Preston North End on 4 January, making his FA Cup debut. He scored his first professional hat-trick in the match, his third senior appearance for Norwich. On 15 January 2022, Idah scored his first Premier League goal for Norwich City in a 2–1 win against Everton. It was his first start for Norwich City in the Premier League and his first start for the Canaries at Carrow Road.

International career
Idah was born in Cork to a Nigerian father and Irish mother. He has been a youth international for Ireland. Following Idah's hat-trick for Norwich City against Preston North End on 4 January 2020, Republic of Ireland manager Mick McCarthy hinted that Idah may soon earn a full cap, commenting "He might have just got himself one", while working as a pundit for BT Sport's coverage of the match. On 24 August 2020, Idah was named in the Republic of Ireland senior squad for the first time for the UEFA Nations League games against Bulgaria and Finland, in what was his manager at under 21 level, Stephen Kenny's first squad as senior manager.

On 3 September 2020, on his first call-up for the senior team, he made his debut in a 1–1 draw away to Bulgaria in the 2020–21 UEFA Nations League.

Career statistics

Club

International

Honours
Norwich City
EFL Championship: 2020–21

References

2001 births
Living people
Association footballers from Cork (city)
Republic of Ireland association footballers
Republic of Ireland youth international footballers
Republic of Ireland under-21 international footballers
Republic of Ireland international footballers
Association football forwards
College Corinthians A.F.C. players
Norwich City F.C. players
Premier League players
English Football League players
Republic of Ireland expatriate association footballers
Expatriate footballers in England
Irish expatriate sportspeople in England
Black Irish sportspeople
Irish people of Nigerian descent
Irish sportspeople of African descent